This is a list of awards and nominations received by Mamamoo, a South Korean girl group formed in 2014 by Rainbow Bridge World. They have won various awards including 5 MAMA Awards, 3 Melon Music Awards, 4 Golden Disc Awards, 4 Seoul Music Awards and 6 Soribada Best K-Music Awards.



Awards and nominations

Other accolades

State honors

Listicles

Notes

References

Mamamoo
Awards